Simbach is the name of two towns in Bavaria, Germany:

Simbach, Dingolfing-Landau
Simbach am Inn, Rottal-Inn
Simbach (Inn) station